Ar-Raheeq Al-Makhtum, is a seerah book, or biography of the Prophet, which was written by Safiur Rahman Mubarakpuri. This book was awarded first prize by the Muslim World League in a worldwide competition on the biography of the Prophet held in Mecca in 1979.

History 
Following in the year 1396 AH, Rabita organized a book writing competition on Islamic Seerat-Un-Nabi. Many writers from different countries participated in this global competition with interest. Out of 171 manuscripts, the book 'Ar-Raheeq Al-Makhtum' won the first prize.

In writing the book, the author has given a series of historical events and in describing them he has arranged the titles of different chapters in chronological order. In cases where there are differences of opinion in different texts, the author reviews everything and mentions what he thinks is correct. In cases where the author does not find the information of dissenters to be correct, he gives an indication of the evidence. Again, the author mentions the names and page numbers of numerous books in the book as a source of information.

At the beginning of the book, the author mentions various conditions and situations that existed in the world before the advent of Muhammad. Through the geographical identity of Arabia, the position of different nations at that time, the leadership, and governance of Arabia, the religious beliefs and doctrines of the Arabs, and the characteristics, economic and social conditions of Pre-Islamic Arabia, the author has beautifully highlighted the importance and significance of Muhammad's appearance.

The various strategies and stages of Muhammad's Dawah are described, including various battles including Badr, Uhud, the conquest of Mecca, the Farewell Hajj, and all the historical events leading up to Muhammad's death.

This biography chronicles the events of Muhammad at different stages of his life. The editing was done under the supervision of The Quran Publishing and Printing, a Riyadh-based company. Twenty-one editions of the book have been published in fifteen years, including the second edition of the book in just fifty-five days. Tauhid Publications later published a translation of the book. Translated from this publication by Abdul Khaleq Rahmani. The name of the book Ar-Rahikul Makhtum means "The Sealed Nectar." The author has named this biography from verse 25 of Surah Mutaffifin of the Quran. Although the original book is about 600 pages, the Bengali translation has 530 pages.

See also 
 The Holy Qur'an: Text, Translation and Commentary
 Al-Khasa'is al-Kubra
 Siyer-i Nebi

Reference

External links 
 Audiobook on audible.com
 See The Online Books Page: Ar-Raheeq Al-Makhtum (The Sealed Nectar): Memoirs of the Noble Prophet
 Ar-Raheeq Al-Makhtum (The Sealed Nectar): Biography of the Prophet Buy on Amazon
 The Sealed Nectar (Ar Raheeq Al Makhtum) - English  (Hardcover, Safiur Rahman Mubarakpuri) Buy on Flipkart
 Seerah (Pdf)

1976 books
Sunni literature